is a Japanese alpine skier. He competed at the 1998 Winter Olympics in Nagano and at the 2002 Winter Olympics in Salt Lake City.

References

External links
 Official JOC profile 

1976 births
Living people
Japanese male alpine skiers
Olympic alpine skiers of Japan
Alpine skiers at the 1998 Winter Olympics
Alpine skiers at the 2002 Winter Olympics